The Mall Group  is one of Thailand's largest mall operators. Its brands include The Mall, Emporium, Siam Paragon, Power Mall, Gourmet Market, The Mall SkyPORT, EmQuartier, SportsMall, BeTrend, and BLÚPORT.

It is a private company and a subsidiary of Lukrak Supachai Company Limited. The current chairwoman is Supaluck Umpujh.  it has 13,000 employees. The group has been a member of the International Association of department stores since 2009.

History

In April 2022, Allegro Group finalized a merger with the Mall Group.

The Mall Group opened its first retail store on 25 June 1981 on Ratchadamri Road in Bangkok. At the time it had 400 employees.

In 2020, the group decided to rebrand for the first time in 39 years, aiming to turn all shopping and retail entertainment complexes to "The Mall Lifestores". According to Chairwoman Supaluck Umpujh, all existing malls should be rebranded by 2023.

In December 2021, the company announced it was teaming up with Bitkub, a cryptocurrency exchange based in Thailand, to form a joint venture aiming to make Thailand a leading hub for digital asset investment.

The company is 65% owned by the Umpujh family and 35% owned by the Phataraprasit family.

Malls

Branch

Former branch 
 The Mall Ratchadamri (Ratchaprasong) - the first store, defunct since 1988
 The Mall III Ramkhamhaeng - supermarket,department store and shopping center, defunct since 2017

See also 
 List of shopping malls in Thailand

References

 
The Mall Group
The Mall Group
The Mall Group
Retail companies established in 1981
Shopping malls established in 1981
Thai brands
Thai companies established in 1981